Mirosław Spiżak (born 13 January 1979) is a Polish former professional footballer who played as striker.

References
 
 
 Leverkusen who's who 
 

1979 births
Living people
Footballers from Kraków
Association football forwards
Polish footballers
MSV Duisburg players
Alemannia Aachen players
Sportfreunde Siegen players
SpVgg Unterhaching players
KFC Uerdingen 05 players
Bayer 04 Leverkusen players
Bayer 04 Leverkusen II players
Expatriate footballers in Germany